Nick Zoppo, best known as Zicky Dice is an American professional wrestler currently under contract with Impact Wrestling. In 2019 he worked with the National Wrestling Alliance, where he became NWA World Television Champion.

Career
Dice was trained in the Black and Brave Wrestling Academy by Seth Rollins and Marek Brave. Then, he participated in a tournament to crown the revived NWA World Television Championship, defeating Caleb Konley in the first round but being defeated by Dan Maff in the second round.  He would win the title on January 26, at NWA Powerrr (aired on March 3) when he defeated Ricky Starks. During the COVID-19 pandemic, the NWA entered in a hiatus and Dices contract was set to expire on December. Dice would lose the title against Elijah Burke during a United Wrestling Network event and left NWA.

On June 8, 2021, Dice appeared at AEW Dark, where he lost against Lance Archer. After leaving the NWA, Dice would sign a contract with Impact Wrestling. He made his debut on September 1, joining Brian Myers stable Learning Tree.

After a falling out with Myers and the disbanding of the Learning Tree in 2022, Dice then aligned himself with Johnny Swinger as a student of "Swinger's Dungeon" (Swinger's wrestling school).

Personal life
Zoppo is also the lead singer of the rock band Heart to Heart.

Championships and accomplishments
 National Wrestling Alliance
 NWA World Television Championship (1 time)
 Southern Honor Wrestling
 SHW Tag Team Championship (1 time) - with Ashton Starr
United Wrestling Network
CWFH Heritage Heavyweight Championship (1 time)
 Memphis Wrestling
Memphis Wrestling Internet Championship (1 time)

 Wrestling With Wregret
WWW YouTube Championship (1 time, current)

References

External links
 Zicky Dice on Impact Wrestling

Living people
American male professional wrestlers
Professional wrestlers from California
Year of birth missing (living people)
21st-century professional wrestlers
NWA World Television Champions